Chamusca is a municipality in Santarém District in Portugal. The population in 2021 was 8,530, in an area of 746.01 km².

The present Mayor is Paulo Queimado, elected by the Socialist Party. The municipal holiday is Ascension Day.

Climate

Parishes
Administratively, the municipality is divided into 5 civil parishes (freguesias):
 Carregueira
 Chamusca e Pinheiro Grande
 Parreira e Chouto
 Ulme
 Vale de Cavalos

Notable people 
 Ruy Gómez de Silva, 1st Prince of Éboli (1516 in Chamusca – 1573) a Portuguese noble and adviser to King Philip II of Spain 
 José Cid (born 1942 in Chamusca) a Portuguese singer and composer.

See also
Chamusca IPR

References

External links
 Photos from Chamusca

Towns in Portugal
Populated places in Santarém District
Municipalities of Santarém District